John Black (born Jean Schwartz; August 16, 1830October 25, 1899) was a French American immigrant and Democratic politician.  He served as the 24th mayor of Milwaukee, Wisconsin, and represented Milwaukee County for three years in the Wisconsin Legislature.

Biography
Black was born near Bitche, Lorraine, France. He attended college in Metz before moving with his family to the United States in 1844, settling near Lockport, New York. He moved with his wife to Milwaukee in 1857, where he started a wholesale wine and liquor business. Black was active in politics, having served in the Wisconsin State Assembly, the Wisconsin State Senate, the Milwaukee Common Council, and, in 1878, as Mayor of Milwaukee for a two-year term, a Democrat in a city largely Republican at the time. He appointed a fellow Democrat as police chief, who fired twenty-five Republican policemen (as part of the spoils system then prevalent). He was described by a contemporary, publisher William George Bruce, as "a tall, broad-shouldered, dark-bearded man, a positive character who spoke his mind freely and who called a spade a spade." Black was the Democratic nominee to the United States Congress in 1886, but was defeated by Henry Smith of the Union Labor Party.

He died at his home in Milwaukee on October 25, 1899. He is buried at Calvary Cemetery.

References

1830 births
1899 deaths
People from Bitche
Mayors of Milwaukee
Democratic Party members of the Wisconsin State Assembly
Wisconsin city council members
Democratic Party Wisconsin state senators
Burials in Wisconsin
19th-century American politicians
French emigrants to the United States